George Wynn Brereton Huntingford (19 November 1901 – 19 February 1978) was an English linguist, anthropologist and historian. He lectured in East African languages and cultures at SOAS, University of London from 1950 until 1966. In 1966, Huntingford went to Canada to organise the Department of Anthropology at the University of New Brunswick at Fredericton, and retired to Málaga the next year, where he lived after his retirement.

Bibliography

 
 The Northern Nilo-Hamites (1953)
 The Southern Nilo- Hamites (1953)
 The Galla of Ethiopia (1955)
 Correspondence, seminar papers and reports relating to the history, languages and culture of the peoples of East Africa, collected by G.W.B. Huntingford are held by SOAS Archives

References

1901 births
1978 deaths
Academics of SOAS University of London
Linguists from the United Kingdom
British anthropologists
People from Newton Abbot
20th-century anthropologists
20th-century linguists
British expatriates in Spain